Joni Isomäki (born May 24, 1985) is a Finnish former ice hockey player. He retired in 2014

Isomaki made his SM-liiga debut playing with Lahti Pelicans during the 2011–12 SM-liiga season.

He now plays rinkball for Flexolahti.

Career statistics

References

External links

1985 births
Living people
Finnish ice hockey right wingers
Lahti Pelicans players
People from Kurikka
Peliitat Heinola players
Sportspeople from South Ostrobothnia